Muhammad Anwar (born 13 April 1959) is a Pakistani wrestler. He competed in the men's freestyle 74 kg at the 1988 Summer Olympics.

References

External links

1959 births
Living people
Pakistani male sport wrestlers
Olympic wrestlers of Pakistan
Wrestlers at the 1988 Summer Olympics
Place of birth missing (living people)
20th-century Pakistani people